Middlewich High School is a co-educational secondary school located in Middlewich, Cheshire, England.

It is a school for 11- to 16-year-olds, and had 708 pupils on roll as of the last OFSTED report, less than the average comprehensive. In its last OFSTED report, it achieved Good. 98.6% of pupils are of white British origin and no pupils take English as an additional language. 10.7% of pupils have Special Educational Needs (SEN). In 2006 Middlewich High School celebrated its centenary. In 2007 it achieved its best GCSE results: 71% at A* - C.

The school is one of the partner high schools of Sir John Deane's Sixth Form College, and sends around 30% of its Year 11 leavers there every September.

Previously a community school administered by Cheshire East Council, in February 2022 Middlewich High School converted to academy status. It is now sponsored by The Sir John Brunner Foundation.

References

External links
 Middlewich High School Homepage

Middlewich
Educational institutions established in 1906
Secondary schools in the Borough of Cheshire East
1906 establishments in England
Academies in the Borough of Cheshire East